The lesser capybara (Hydrochoerus isthmius) is a large semiaquatic rodent of the family Caviidae found in eastern Panama, northwestern Colombia, and western Venezuela. The lesser capybara was described as a species in 1912, but was later re-categorized as a subspecies of the capybara (H. hydrochaeris). Following studies of anatomy and genetics in the mid-1980s, it was recommended that it again should be recognized as a separate species, and this gained more widespread recognition in 1991, although some continue to consider it a subspecies.

The lesser capybara breeds year-round, with an average litter size of 3.5. Individuals may be diurnal or nocturnal and solitary or social depending on season, habitat, and hunting pressure. This species is reported to be common in Panama, but rare in Venezuela. It is threatened by subsistence hunting, the destruction of gallery forests, and swamp drainage, specifically that of the Magdalena River. Its karyotype has 2n = 64 and FN = 104, compared to 2n = 66 and FN = 102 for H. hydrochaeris.

References 

Rodents of South America
Rodents of Central America
Mammals of Colombia
Mammals of Venezuela
Cavies
Aquatic mammals
Mammals described in 1912
Taxa named by Edward Alphonso Goldman